Saïd Saïbi (born 4 June 1975) is a Tunisian footballer and later manager.

References

1975 births
Living people
Tunisian footballers
Stade Tunisien players
CA Bizertin players
ES Zarzis players
ES Hammam-Sousse players
Tunisian Ligue Professionnelle 1 players
Tunisian football managers
Najran SC managers
Tunisian Ligue Professionnelle 1 managers
Saudi First Division League managers
Tunisian expatriate football managers
Expatriate football managers in Saudi Arabia
Tunisian expatriate sportspeople in Saudi Arabia
Association footballers not categorized by position